Model Store is a heritage-listed commercial building at 582 David Street, Albury, City of Albury, New South Wales, Australia. It was added to the New South Wales State Heritage Register on 2 April 1999.

Heritage listing 

Model Store was listed on the New South Wales State Heritage Register on 2 April 1999, on the basis that it shows the earlier importance of Wilson Street and is a good representation of architecture of federation commercial styles.

See also

References

Attribution

External links

New South Wales State Heritage Register
Albury, New South Wales
Commercial buildings in New South Wales
Articles incorporating text from the New South Wales State Heritage Register